Hasan Maymandi was an Iranian nobleman, who served as the governor of Bust under the Ghaznavid ruler Sabuktigin (r. 977-997), who was a vassal of the Samanid Empire. At an unknown date, Sabuktigin had Hasan crucified, an action which he later regretted. Hasan had a son named Ahmad Maymandi, who would later occupy high offices under the Ghaznavids.

References

Sources 
 

10th-century deaths
10th-century births
10th-century Iranian politicians
Ghaznavid governors